Ricarda Lobe (born 1994 in Landau in der Pfalz, Germany) is a German 100m and 60m hurdler. She also competes in 60m (indoor), 100m and 200m and also 4x100 relay. Ricarda Lobe is in the MTG Manneheim team. She competed in 2017 European Athletics Indoor Championships in Belgrade and she was 6th place in finals of 60m hurdles with 8.03".

Lobe competed in 2017 IAAF World Championships and advanced to the semifinals of the 100m hurdles. She was also 3rd in German championships in the same year in the same event.

Ricarda Lobe trains with training partners Lisa Mayer and Nadine Gongska.

Her personal best time is 12.91 and 7.99 for 100m hurdles and 60m hurdles, respectively.

References 

1994 births
Living people
People from Landau
Sportspeople from Rhineland-Palatinate
German female hurdlers
German female sprinters
World Athletics Championships athletes for Germany
German national athletics champions
Athletes (track and field) at the 2020 Summer Olympics
Olympic athletes of Germany